The 2010 MasterCard Tennis Cup was a professional tennis tournament played on outdoor red clay courts. It was the tenth edition of the tournament which was part of the 2010 ATP Challenger Tour. It took place in Campos do Jordão, Brazil between 2 and 8 August 2010.

Singles main draw entrants

Seeds

 Rankings are as of July 26, 2010.

Other entrants
The following players received wildcards into the singles main draw:
  Guilherme Clézar
  Marcelo Demoliner
  José Pereira
  Thiago Pinheiro

The following players received entry from the qualifying draw:
  Rogério Dutra da Silva
  Toshihide Matsui
  Fernando Romboli
  Eduardo Struvay

Champions

Singles

 Izak van der Merwe def.  Ricardo Mello, 7–6(6), 6–3

Doubles

 Rogério Dutra da Silva /  Júlio Silva def.  Vítor Manzini /  Pedro Zerbinni, 7–6(3), 6–2

External links
Official website
ITF search 
2010 Draws

MasterCard Tennis Cup
MasterCard Tennis Cup
MasterCard Tennis Cup
Mast